Penicillium cryptum is a species of the genus of Penicillium.

See also
List of Penicillium species

References 

cryptum
Fungi described in 1986